Ljubica Jelušič (born 16 June 1960 in Koper, FPR Yugoslavia) is a Slovenian politician. She is a lecturer in defense studies at the University of Ljubljana's Faculty of Social Sciences, served as Minister of Defence in the government of Borut Pahor (2008–2011), and is a former member of the National Assembly.

External links
 
 mo.gov.si
 fdv.uni-lj.si

|-

1960 births
Living people
Defence ministers of Slovenia
Female defence ministers
21st-century Slovenian women politicians
21st-century Slovenian politicians
Politicians from Koper
Officers of the Yugoslav People's Army
Social Democrats (Slovenia) politicians
Academic staff of the University of Ljubljana
Women government ministers of Slovenia